Bujlood (بوجلود father of pelts or بيلماون or ⴱⵉⵍⵎⴰⵡⵏ) is a folk Amazigh celebration observed annually after Eid al-Adha in parts of Morocco in which a person or more wears the pelt of the livestock sacrificed on Eid al-Adha.

Etymology 

Observance 
The celebration begins with a  carnival, usually on the day after Eid al-Adha, when young people wear masks and the skins of the sheep or goats that were sacrificed on the Eid. They dance around in their masks and costumes carrying limbs of the sacrificed animals, which they use to play with people they run into and trying to touch them. The point is to spread laughter and cheer.

Interpretations 
The French ethnologists Edmond Doutté and  connect the tradition to pre-Islamic Amazigh rites celebrating the changing of seasons and death and resurrection. The Finnish anthropologist Edvard Westermarck connected the tradition to the Roman Saturnalia festival.

The Moroccan anthropologist Abdellah Hammoudi, in his essay The Victim and Its Masks: An Essay on Sacrifice and Masquerade in the Maghreb, refutes these interpretations and contextualizes bujlood as a Moroccan cultural practice inseparable from the Eid al-Adha sacrifice.

 has also written about the sacrifice traditions of the Ait Mizan and the Ait Souka in the High Atlas.

Islamic opinion 
In the opinion of some local Islamic scholars, this celebration is "not permissible as it likens humans, who have been blessed by God, to beasts, and the skin of these animals defiles the human body. It also makes it impossible to pray on time, because changing in and out of the clothes takes time, and the individual in question has to wash himself in ablution after each removal of the skins, as they give off a nasty odor, especially in the summer time."

References 

Berber culture